Rüstem Pasha Caravanserai may refer to:

 Rüstem Pasha Caravanserai (Edirne)
 Rüstem Pasha Caravanserai (Erzurum)
Rüstem Pasha Caravanserai (Ereğli)